The Neve 8078 was the last of the "80 series" hand-wired analogue mixing consoles designed and manufactured by Neve Electronics, founded in 1961 by the English electronics engineer Rupert Neve, for high-end recording studios during the 1970s. Some were custom built for major studios like CBS Sony.
 
The rarity of these consoles makes them quite valuable. The classic Neve sound has featured on records by artists including Steely Dan, Nirvana, Megs McLean, Pink Floyd, Dire Straits, Quincy Jones, George Clinton, and Chick Corea.

A limited number of these consoles were ever made and there are now only a few select studios who have 8078 consoles still working perfectly after several decades. These include:

 Flying Blanket Recording in Mesa, Arizona, owned by record producer, songwriter and musician Bob Hoag
 Groove Masters Studio in Santa Monica, California (72 inputs)
 Blackbird Studio A in Nashville, Tennessee (72 inputs)
Clubhouse in Rhinebeck, New York (8028)
 Dockside Studio in Milton, Louisiana (52 input 8058 with automation)
 EastWest Studios in Hollywood, California
 Electric Lady Studios in New York City
 ElectraSonic Sound Recording Studio in North Vancouver, British Columbia, Canada
 Vox Recording Studios in Hollywood, California (24-channel 8028)
 Lattitude Studio South in Leipers Fork (Nashville) Tennessee owned by producer, writer, engineer, mixer Michael Lattanzi. Console previously owned by Dave Way in Los Angeles
 Long View Studios in North Brookfield, Massachusetts
 Ocean Way Nashville in Nashville, Tennessee (80 inputs)
 Clive Davis Institute of Recorded Music in Brooklyn Oscilloscope Laboratories in Tribeca (custom modified with 72 Channels of flying faders), formerly housed in Threshold Sound + Vision, with an API sidecar, which was formerly housed at Sony Music West in Santa Monica, California prior to that.
 The Parlor Recording Studios in New Orleans, Louisiana
 Pedernales Country Club in Austin, Texas, Willie Nelson's studio
 Royaltone Studios in North Hollywood, California, now owned by songwriter producer Linda Perry
 The Site Recording Environment in Marin County, California
 Sonic Ranch in Tornillo, Texas. Custom console has 80-channels of pres (two consoles combined by Pat Schneider and Bill Dooley) with flying faders, 32 channels of monitor inputs, and 24 buses largest vintage Neve in the world. Originally in Motown West Coast, it moved L.A.'s Brooklyn Studios owned by Freddy Demann and Madonna, then acquired by Yoshiki from X Japan.
 Sound City Studios in Van Nuys, California (operating one 28-channel 8028 and one 40-channel 8078) (which closed in May 2011 and reopened in early 2017). The board was purchased by Dave Grohl for his personal studio, Studio 606. In 2013, he produced a documentary about the console and an album recorded with it with a large panel of rock stars, called Sound City
 Sphere Studios in Los Angeles, California
 The Way Recording Studio in London, England

Removing many of the inadequacies of the 8078 series was a custom-made Neve console A4792, constructed in 1978, at Associated Independent Recording (AIR) studios in Montserrat, which was founded by George Martin. Used on such recordings as Dire Straits' award-winning album Brothers in Arms, that A4792 console is now in operation at Subterranean Sound Studios in Toronto, Ontario. Only three of these consoles were ever made with the other two originally installed at AIR Studios in London. AIR Lyndhurst still has one of the two remaining consoles in operation today while the other is in use at The Warehouse Studio in Vancouver, B.C.

See also 
 Comparison of analog and digital recording

References 

Sound recording technology
Mixing consoles